The Regional Municipality of Wood Buffalo (abbreviated RMWB) is a specialized municipality in northeast Alberta, Canada. It is the second largest municipality in Alberta by area and is home to oil sand deposits known as the Athabasca oil sands.

History 
The Municipality of Wood Buffalo was incorporated as a specialized municipality on April 1, 1995 as a result of the amalgamation of the City of Fort McMurray and Improvement District No. 143. Specialized municipality status was granted to provide "for the unique needs of a municipality including a large urban centre and a large rural territory with a small population." The Municipality of Wood Buffalo subsequently changed its name to the Regional Municipality of Wood Buffalo on August 14, 1996.

June 2013 floods 
By June 12, 2013, after many days of heavy rain, the Regional Municipality of Wood Buffalo declared a state of emergency.

2016 wildfire 

From May 3, 2016 on, over 80,000 people were affected by evacuations, by May 3 at 6:49 pm, the entirety of Fort McMurray and surrounding areas were placed under a mandatory evacuation. making it Alberta's largest evacuation for a wildfire.

Geography 
The Regional Municipality (RM) of Wood Buffalo is in the northeast corner of the province of Alberta. It borders the province of Saskatchewan to the east; the Northwest Territories to the north; Improvement District No. 24 (Wood Buffalo National Park), Mackenzie County, and the Municipal District of Opportunity No. 17 to the west; and Athabasca County and the Municipal District of Bonnyville No. 87 to the south. The Athabasca River meanders northward through the central portion of the RM of Wood Buffalo before emptying into Lake Athabasca. Some of its water bodies include Christina Lake, Gardiner Lakes, Garson Lake, Gipsy Lake, Gordon Lake, Gregoire Lake, McClelland Lake, Namur Lake, Richardson Lake, and Winefred Lake (also partially within Lac La Biche County and the Municipal District of Bonnyville No. 87). Discharging northward from Lake Athabasca is Riviere des Rochers, which at its confluence with the Peace River becomes the Slave River. The Slave River forms much of the RM of Wood Buffalo's boundary with Improvement District No. 24 north of the confluence. Land formations include the Birch Mountains northwest of Fort McKay, Fort Hills north of Fort McKay, and Thickwood Hills west of Fort McMurray. A portion of the Peace-Athabasca Delta is also within the RM of Wood Buffalo.

Communities and localities  

The following urban municipalities are surrounded by the Regional Municipality of Wood Buffalo:
Cities
none
Towns
none
Villages
none
Summer villages
none

The following hamlets are located within the Regional Municipality of Wood Buffalo:
Hamlets
Anzac
Conklin
Fort Chipewyan
Fort McKay
Fort McMurray (urban service area)
Gregoire Lake Estates
Janvier South
Saprae Creek

The following localities are located within the Regional Municipality of Wood Buffalo:

Almac Subdivision
Beaver Lake-Young's Beach
Bechtel Syncrude Camp
Berdinskies
Berny
Big Eddy
Billos
Bitumount
Brièreville
Chard
Charron
Cheecham
Christina Crossing
Corbetts
Devenish
Dog Head
Draper
Egg Lake

 Portage
Fitzgerald
Fitzgerald 196
Fitzgerald Settlement
Fort Smith Settlement
Gourin
Grandin
Improvement District No.143
Kenny Woods
Kinosis
Le Goff
Leismer
Lenarthur
Lynton
Maloy
Mariana Lake
Mildred Lake
Old Fort
Pelican Settlement
Pingle
Point Brule
Quigley
Rossian
Sandy Rapids
Tar Island
Waterways
Willow Trail
Wolyn

The following settlements are within the Regional Municipality of Wood Buffalo:

Chipewyan
Fitzgerald (Smith Landing)
Janvier South
Mariana
McKay
St. Bruno Farm (also partially within Improvement District No. 24)

First Nations have the following Indian reserves within the Regional Municipality of Wood Buffalo:

Allison Bay 219
Charles Lake 225
Chipewyan 201
Chipewyan 201A
Chipewyan 201B
Chipewyan 201C
Chipewyan 201D
Chipewyan 201E
Chipewyan 201F
Chipewyan 201G
Clearwater 175
Collin Lake 223
Cornwall Lake 224
Cowper Lake 194A
Devil's Gate 220
Dog Head 218
Fort McKay 174
Fort McKay 174C
Fort McKay 174D
Gregoire Lake 176
Hokedhe Tue 196E
House River Indian Cemetery 178
Janvier 194
K'i Tue 196D
Li Deze 196C
Namur Lake 174B
Namur River 174A
Old Fort 217
Sandy Point 221
Thabacha Nare 196A
Thebathi 196
Tsu K'adhe Tue 196F
Tsu Tue 196G
Winefred Lake 194B

Hydrology 
The Regional Municipality of Wood Buffalo (RMWB) is in the lower basin of the Athabasca River watershed and Fort McMurray is the largest community on the banks of the river. Local rivers include the Hangingstone River, Clearwater River and Christina River, a tributary of the Clearwater River.

The river often experiences high flows in the spring during snow melt, during heavy rainfall events and when ice jams occur during spring ice break. The RMWB warns citizens of the potential for sudden flash floods "especially in populated areas adjacent to the Athabasca River, Clearwater River and Christina River." Water levels have been monitored by the Water Survey of Canada since 1970 (WSC station 07CD004). During the spring months there is increased monitoring of the "Clearwater River to the south of the urban service area to provide warning of an ice break" and the "Athabasca River upper basin, local river levels, precipitation and overall weather patterns."

The Clearwater River, designated as part of the Canadian Heritage Rivers System, flows  from its headwaters at Lloyd Lake in northwest Saskatchewan into northeast Alberta before joining the Athabasca River at Fort McMurray. "The lack of significant oil sands developments means that the Clearwater River can be used as a baseline river system to provide information on the variability and characteristics of natural systems."

Demographics

Federal census 

Municipal census 

In addition, the 2021 municipal census counted a shadow population of 30,504 non-permanent residents for a combined population of 106,059, while the 2018 municipal census counted 36,678 non-permanent residents for a combined population of 111,687.

Ethnicity

Language

Immigration 
Wood Buffalo is home to almost 2,000 recent immigrants (arriving between 2001 and 2006) who now make up more than 3% of the population. About 21% of these immigrants came from India, while about 10% came from each of Pakistan and the Philippines, and about 9% came from Venezuela, and about 8% from South Africa, about 6% from China, and about 3% came from Colombia.

Religion 
More than 80% of residents identified as Christian at the time of the 2001 census while almost 17% indicated they had no religious affiliation. For specific denominations Statistics Canada counted 15,880 Roman Catholics (37.4%), 4,985 Anglicans (11.7%), 4,225 for the United Church of Canada (9.9%), 1,730 Pentecostals (4.1%), 1,195 Baptists (2.8%), 965 for the Salvation Army (2.3%), 900 Lutherans (2.1%), 690 Muslims (1.6%), 350 Latter-day Saints (0.8%), and 320 Presbyterians (0.8%).

Economy 
The Regional Municipality of Wood Buffalo is home to vast oil sand deposits, also known as the Athabasca Oil Sands, helping to make the region one of the fastest growing industrial areas in Canada.

Attractions 
Wood Buffalo National Park is adjacent to the Regional Municipality (RM) of Wood Buffalo to the northwest. The following provincial protected areas are also within the RM of Wood Buffalo:

Birch Mountains Wildland Provincial Park
Birch River Wildland Provincial Park
Dillon River Wildland Provincial Park
Fidler-Greywillow Wildland Provincial Park
Gipsy Lake Wildland Provincial Park
Grand Rapids Wildland Provincial Park
Gregoire Lake Provincial Park
Kazan Wildland Provincial Park
Kitaskino Nuwenëné Wildland Provincial Park
Marguerite River Wildland Provincial Park
Richardson Wildland Provincial Park
Stony Mountain Wildland Provincial Park
Whitemud Falls Wildland Provincial Park

Government 
The municipality's current mayor is Sandy Bowman, who was first elected in 2021. Its first mayor upon its creation in 1995 was Guy Boutilier, who had previously been the mayor of Fort McMurray and was subsequently elected as the region's provincial MLA. Doug Faulkner served as mayor from 1997 to 2004, and Melissa Blake from 2004 to 2017.

In the Legislative Assembly of Alberta, the municipality was served by the electoral district of Fort McMurray-Wood Buffalo until 2010, when a second district, Fort McMurray-Conklin, was created due to population growth. The new riding then became Fort McMurray-Lac La Biche in 2018.

Fort McMurray-Wood Buffalo is currently represented by Tany Yao and Fort McMurray-Lac La Biche is represented by Brian Jean. Both MLAs are former members of the Wildrose Party and are current members of the United Conservative Party.

As of 2016, the municipality is located in the federal electoral district of Fort McMurray—Cold Lake. The riding has been represented in the House of Commons of Canada by former UCP MLA for Fort McMurray-Lac La Biche Laila Goodridge of the Conservative Party of Canada since 2021.

See also 
List of communities in Alberta
List of specialized municipalities in Alberta

Notes

References

External links 

 
1995 establishments in Alberta
Wood Buffalo